Norodom Sihanouk was the King of Cambodia who reigned between 1941 and 1955 and again from 1993 to 2004. Sihanouk was also known as a filmmaker. He often simultaneously produced, directed and wrote the scripts of his films. He also acted in a few of his own films, and produced a total of 50 films throughout his lifetime.

Filmography

Documentaries
Cambodge 1965 (1965)
Cortège Royal (1969)
Norodom Sihanouk, Roi Cinéaste (1997), directed by Jean-Baptiste Martin
The Curious History of Cambodia's Beloved Kings (2021)

References

Bibliography

External links

Male actor filmographies
Director filmographies
Norodom Sihanouk